Climate Action Network Latin America (CAN-LA or CANLA) is a Latin American climate justice organisation. Founded in 2009 and based in Buenos Aires, it is the regional network of the Climate Action Network and considered a "node" helping to collaborate in the Latin American and Caribbean region. It links over 30 non-governmental organisations, which are engaged in climate justice issues and active against climate change (as of 25 April 2020).

Structure 
The regional network is composed of more than 30 organizations from different countries in Latin America. Currently, it is coordinated by Alejandro Aleman from the Nicaraguan organisation Centro Humboldt (as of 25 April 2020). Within CAN International, there is a regional officer. At the moment Karla Maass hold this position (as of 25 April 2020).

Member organisations of CAN-LA are located in:

 Argentina
 Barbados
 Bolivia
 Brazil
 Chile
 Colombia
 Haiti
 Honduras
 Mexico
 Nicaragua
 Paraguay
 Peru
 United States (Ciudadnía Sustentable frente al Cambio Climatico, A.C.)
 Uruguay
 Venezuela

Activities 
The regional node tries to foster networks between different organisations working in Central and Latin America. The organisation's reasoning behind it is that through collaboration, the organisations can more easily further the cause of climate justice.

One of the most important functions of the organisation is Latin American representation at UN climate conferences. Delegates of CAN-LA attend the climate negotiations under the UN Framework Convention on Climate Change (UNFCCC). They are present at the conferences of the parties (COP) and the intersessionals in Bonn. Since COP20 in 2014, they have press conferences to inform the public about their views. During COPs, they organise side events where they can set their own agenda and invite panelists. They also inform the public and publish reports, analyses and comments, for example in the Chilean newspaper "El dínamo". Before COP23, the network organised a webinar called "Camino a la COP23: Una visión desde América Latina y el Caribe".

After COP25, they wrote a report about their view on the negotiations and reflecting on the outcome. That the climate conference in 2019 was moved from Chile to Spain was considered a missed opportunity for Latin America, not only because many representatives could not be present, but also because a bigger cohesion within the region was not reached.

They reacted to the postponement of COP26 due to the COVID-19 pandemic with a common declaration highlighting that the health crisis is connected to the bigger ecological crisis and the most vulnerable communities are affected the most by both crises.

References

External links 
 CAN-LA at the website of Climate Action Network
 Twitter-Account of CAN-LA

Environmental organisations based in Argentina
International climate change organizations